Adolph Leonard Kvam (November 30, 1917 – September 17, 2006) was an American politician who served in the Minnesota House of Representatives from 1967 to 1987.

Kvam was born in Minneapolis, Minnesota. He graduated from Willmar High School, in Willmar, Minnesota. Kvam served in the United States Army during World War. Kvam lived with his wife and family in Litchfield, Minnesota. Kvam was an automobile dealer in Litchfield, Minnesota. He served on the Litchfield City Planning Board and on the Litchfield School Board. He graduated from University of Minnesota with a degree in agriculture business and agricultural economics. He died on September 17, 2006, in Bloomington, Minnesota at age 88.

References

1917 births
2006 deaths
Businesspeople from Minneapolis
People from Litchfield, Minnesota
Politicians from Minneapolis
Republican Party members of the Minnesota House of Representatives
School board members in Minnesota
Military personnel from Minnesota
University of Minnesota alumni
20th-century American politicians